Cheap is the first album by Seasick Steve. It consists of songs by him and his Swedish/Norwegian band The Level Devils, and also two stories from his life as a hobo.

The Level Devils consisted of the Norwegian Kai Christoffersen playing the drums and the Swedish Jo Husmo on bass guitar.

Hidden track
A hidden track can be found at the 4:20 mark of the last listed track "Rooster Blues".  No title is given.

Track listing
 "Cheap" - 4:05
 "Rockin' Chair" - 3:35
 "Hobo Blues" - 3:01
 "Story #1" - 5:45
 "Sorry Mr. Jesus" - 4:17
 "Love Thang" - 3:44
 "Dr. Jekyll and Mr. Hyde" - 5:14
 "Story #2" - 7:06
 "8 Ball" - 3:41
 "Xmas Prison Blues" - 4:16
 "Levi Song" - 4:19
 "Rooster Blues" - 10:47

Personnel
Seasick Steve - guitars and foot percussion
Jo Husmo - bass guitar
Kai Christoffersen - drums

References

External links
 Official website
 Seasick Steve interview at musicOMH
 Seasick Steve interview at Blues In London
 Record Label - Bronzerat recordings

2004 debut albums
Seasick Steve albums